Moabi may refer to:

 Moabi (Gabon), the capital of Douigni, Gabon
 Moabi Airport
 Commune of Moabi, a commune of Gabon
 Baillonella toxisperma, a tropical tree

See also
 Moab (disambiguation)
 Moabite (disambiguation)